The 1930 NC State Wolfpack football team was an American football team that represented North Carolina State University as a member of the Southern Conference (SoCon) during the 1930 college football season. In its first and only season under head coach John Van Liew, the team compiled a 2–8 record (1–5 against SoCon opponents), tied for 19th place in the conference, and was outscored by a total of 125 to 54.

Schedule

References

NC State
NC State Wolfpack football seasons
NC State Wolfpack football